Watersmeet is a village in the Uthukela District Municipality in the KwaZulu-Natal province of South Africa.

References

Populated places in the Alfred Duma Local Municipality